= By My Spirit =

Memorial event in Spain in 1992

By My Spirit was a worldwide gathering that occurred in Toledo, Spain on May 3 and 4 of 1992. Its purpose was to commemorate the 500th anniversary of the expulsion of Spain's Jews. Organized mainly by Michele Bokobza, this event gathered around 3000 people: Jews, Spaniards and other noteworthy personalities like Queen Sophia of Spain. The most represented nationalities were the U.S., France, Israel and Belgium.

The "Spirit" of this event was forgiveness : bringing back together two people - Jews and Spaniards.

One of By My Spirit's main events was the concert during which the Israel Philharmonic Orchestra performed; in particular the No.2 Violin Concerto piece of Mendelssohn.

Later that night, the Hatikvah torch was lit and used to light seven other torches handed to the ambassadors of the countries that received the exiled Jews 500 years ago: France, Greece, Bulgaria, Yugoslavia, Morocco, Turkey and Italy. These torches were taken to their respective countries, many of which then held ceremonies.
